This is a table of extreme points (north, south, east and west) of each of the provinces and territories of Canada.  Many of these points are uninhabited; see also extreme communities of Canada for inhabited places.

See also

Extreme points of Canada
List of highest points of Canadian provinces and territories
Extreme communities of Canada
Nordicity
Remote and isolated community

References

Extreme points of Canada
Extreme points
Canadian provinces